Masca is a small mountain village on the island of Tenerife. It was originally a Guanche settlement before the Spanish conquest in 1496.  The village is now home to around 90 inhabitants.  The village lies at an altitude of 650 m in the Macizo de Teno mountains, which extend up to the northwesternmost point of Tenerife.

Forests including cypresses and palm trees abound. The village lies at the head of the Masca Gorge. The trail from the village down the gorge to the beach on the Atlantic Ocean is a popular, though strenuous, hiking route, which takes about 3 hours each way.

References

External links

Populated places in Tenerife